= Rosario Navas Morata =

Cuban diplomat

Rosario Navas Morata is a diplomat for Cuba.

At the age of 28, she became the First Secretary of the Cuban Embassy in Angola. Then, she represented the country in other nations, including Italy, Belgium, and the United States.

In 1994, she began to serve as an ambassador to Spain.

From 2006 to 2011, Morata was Cuba's ambassador extraordinary and plenipotentiary to Poland.
